Statistics of the 1985–86 Saudi First Division.

External links 
 Saudi Arabia Football Federation
 Saudi League Statistics
 Al Jazirah 7 Mar 1986 issue 4908 

Saudi First Division League seasons
Saudi Professional League
2